This following is a list of notable Mongolian sumo wrestlers.


A
Arawashi Tsuyoshi
Asasekiryū Tarō
Asashōryū Akinori
Azumaryū Tsuyoshi

B
Ulambayaryn Byambajav

C
Chiyoshōma Fujio

D
Daishōhō Kiyohiro

H
Hakuba Takeshi
Hakuhō Shō
Harumafuji Kōhei
Hōshōryū Tomokatsu

I
Ichinojō Takashi

K
Kagamiō Hideoki
Kakuryū Rikisaburō
Kiribayama Tetsuo
Kōryū Tadaharu
Kyokushūhō Kōki
Kyokushūzan Noboru
Kyokutenhō Masaru
Kyokutenzan Takeshi

M
Mitoryū Takayuki
Mōkonami Sakae

R
Ryūō Noboru

S
Seirō Takeshi
Shōtenrō Taishi

T
Takanoiwa Yoshimori
Tamawashi Ichirō
Terunofuji Haruo
Tokitenkū Yoshiaki
Tokusegawa Masanao

Lists of sumo wrestlers
sumo wrestlers